Cat 7 or CAT7 may refer to:

 Category 7 cable, a cable standard
 Lasqueti Island/False Bay Water Aerodrome (ICAO airport code: CAT7)
 LTE User Equipment Category 7, in E-UTRA